Phalasia is a village in Rajasthan, India, approximately 80 kilometers from Udaipur.
The main places to visit in Phalasia  are Lapni saat, Nagmala Talab.

The people of Phalasia village are very religious.
Some of famous temples in phalasia - 
1. Shree 1008 Padamprabhu Jain Mandir
2. Ambey mata mandir
3. Paaleshwar Mahadev
4. Sheetala mataji Mandir
5. Thakurji mandir
6. Vijasan Mataji

The main source of income here is farming.

The tehsil headquarter is Jhadol .

As of 2009, the population is estimated to be 5000.

Phalasia Pin Code

References

Villages in Udaipur district